Alison Bai and Jaimee Fourlis were the defending champions but Fourlis chose not to participate. Bai partnered alongside Alexandra Osborne but lost in the quarterfinals to Kimberly Birrell and Priscilla Hon.

Ankita Raina and Arina Rodionova won the title, defeating Fernanda Contreras and Alana Parnaby in the final, 4–6, 6–2, [11–9].

Seeds

Draw

Draw

References
Main Draw

ACT Clay Court International 2 - Doubles